This is a list of members of the 10th Parliament of Somalia, elected in Somali parliamentary election held in 2016 It covers both Upper House (Senate) and Lower House (House of the People) members in the national bicameral legislature, based in Mogadishu, the capital of Somalia. the listed Members of Parliament (MPs) are scheduled to serve from 2016 to 2020.

List of members of the Federal Parliament

Upper House
As of 3 April 2017, the official list of members of the upper house which currently stands at 48 is as follows:

House of the People
The House of the People, or Lower House, is eventually expected to comprise 275 MPs. , the official list of House of the People MPs which currently stands at 261 is as follows:

Notes

References

External links
Federal Parliament of Somalia - Members

Politics of Somalia
Government of Somalia
Somalia
Somalia